Play the Game is a 2009 romantic comedy film starring Andy Griffith, Paul Campbell, Liz Sheridan, Doris Roberts, and Marla Sokoloff, written and directed by Marc Fienberg. This was Andy Griffith's last film credit; he died on July 3, 2012. The film received attention for containing a sex scene between Sheridan and Griffith.

Synopsis 
Play the Game tells the story of a young ladies' man, David, who teaches his lonely, widowed grandfather how to play the dating game, while playing his best games to win over Julie, the girl of his dreams. But as David's "foolproof" techniques prove to be anything but in his pursuit of Julie, the same techniques quickly transform Grandpa into the Don Juan of the retirement community. Slowly, the teacher becomes the student, and Grandpa must teach David how to win back the love of his life.

Cast 
Paul Campbell as David Mitchell
Andy Griffith as Grandpa Joe
Marla Sokoloff as Julie Larabee
Liz Sheridan as Edna Gordon
Doris Roberts as Rose Sherman
Clint Howard as Dick
Rance Howard as Mervin
Geoffrey Owens as Rob
Juliette Jeffers as Carri

Soundtrack 
Beth Thornley – "Lie"
Jack's Mannequin – "Dark Blue"
Ludo – "Hum Along"
Elizabeth & The Catapult – "Race You"
Ethan Gold – "Pretty Girls"
Barenaked Ladies – "Sound of Your Voice"
Marching Band – "Gorgeous Behaviour"
Rocky Votolato – "Your Darkest Eyes"
Emi Meyer – "One Good Song"
Sherwood – "Best In Me"
Leroy Osbourne – "All I Want Is You"
Michael Rossback – "Don't Rush Me"
Chelsea Williams – "You Don't Wanna Know"
John Gold – "Cactus Flower"
Dan Ferrari – "Never Not Want You"
Katelyn Tarver – "Wonderful Crazy"
Relient K – "Must Have Done Something Right"
Ludo – "Laundry Girl"

References

External links 
 
 
 

2009 films
2009 romantic comedy films
American romantic comedy films
2000s English-language films
2000s American films